12 teams from Bosnia and Herzegovina, Croatia, Serbia and Montenegro and Slovenia participated in Goodyear League in its first season: Union Olimpija, Krka, Pivovarna Laško, Geoplin Slovan, Cibona VIP, Zadar, Triglav Osiguranje, Split Croatia Osiguranje, FEAL Široki, Bosna ASA, Sloboda Dita, Budućnost.

In February 2002 ABA was admitted as an equal member of the ULEB association.

There were 22 rounds played in the regular part of the season, best four teams qualified for the Final Four Tournament which was played in Ljubljana on March 23 and 24 2002.

The first trophy in Goodyear League was won by Union Olimpija.

Regular season

Final four
Matches played at Hala Tivoli, Ljubljana

Stats leaders

Ranking MVP

Points

Rebounds

Assists
{| class="wikitable" style="text-align: center;"
|-
!Rank
!width="175"|Name
!width="120"|Team
!width="60"|Assists
!width="60"|Games
!width="60"|APG
|-
|1.||align="left"| Rumeal Robinson||align="left"| Zadar||50||12||4.17
|-
|2.||align="left"| Dragan Aleksić ||align="left"| Sloboda Dita||91||22||4.14
|-
|3.||align="left"| Marko Popović ||align="left"| Zadar||61||17||3.59
|-
|4.||align="left"| Mladen Erjavec||align="left"| FEAL Široki||67||22||3.05
|-
|3.||align="left"| Davor Marcelić ||align="left"| Zadar||48||16||3.00
|-

References

External links

2001–02
2001–02 in European basketball leagues
2001–02 in Serbian basketball
2001–02 in Slovenian basketball
2001–02 in Croatian basketball
2001–02 in Bosnia and Herzegovina basketball